Highland-on-the-Lake is a hamlet and census-designated place (CDP) in the town of Evans, Erie County, New York, United States. It was first listed as a CDP prior to the 2020 census.

The CDP is in the southwestern part of the county, in the northern part of the town of Evans. New York State Route 5 runs through the CDP, leading northeast  to Buffalo and southwest  to Dunkirk. The Frank Lloyd Wright-designed Graycliff is in the northern part of the CDP, overlooking Lake Erie.

Demographics

References 

Census-designated places in Erie County, New York
Census-designated places in New York (state)